The daityas are a race of asuras in Hindu mythology, descending from Kashyapa and his wife, Diti. Prominent members of this race include Hiranyaksha, Hiranyakashipu, and Mahabali, all of whom overran the earth, and required three of Vishnu's avataras to be vanquished.

Literature 
The Manusmṛiti classifies the daityas as good, while placing them at a lower level than the devas:

The origin and noteworthy members of this race are specified in the Harivamsha Purana:

List of daityas 

Some of the notable daityas mentioned in Hindu mythology include:

Hiranyakashipu - First son of Kashyapa and Diti
Hiraṇyakṣa - Second son of Kashyapa and Diti
Holika  - First daughter of Kashyapa and Diti
Andhakasura - Son of Hiranyaksha (Born from the sweat of Shiva)
Prahlada - Son of Hiranyakashipu
Simhika - Daughter of Hiranyakashipu
Virocana - Son of Prahlada, father of Mahabali
 Devamba - Mother of Mahabali
Mahabali - Son of Virochana
Baṇasura - Son of Mahabali
Rahu
Tarakasura 
Tripurasura - Son of Tarakasura
Shambasura

See also 
Danavas
Kalakeyas
Nivatakavacha
Asura
List of Asuras
 Devas

References

Notes

External links

Giants
 
Characters in Hindu mythology